Music Australia is a free national online service hosted by the National Library of Australia in conjunction with over 50 cultural organisations across Australia. It was launched on 14 March 2005. It covers all types, styles and genres of Australian music, and showcases Australia’s musical culture across contemporary and historical periods, from the 19th century. Music Australia operates with a broad definition of 'Australian music', and covers music published in Australia or music composed or performed by Australians or about Australia or Australians. Music Australia provides a ‘virtual’ Australian national music collection, with metadata aggregated centrally by the National Library but access to the resources being through the holding institution.

Model
Music Australia uses two linked databases, one for resources and one for people and organisation information. A search will find music and music-related resources physically scattered across Australia.

Items referenced include music scores, sound recordings, websites, pictures, films, multimedia, kits, objects, archival collections and other music-related material held in libraries, archives, museums, universities, and specialist music and research organisations in Australia.

The service contains information about Australian music, including books and theses, information created by Australians about non-Australian music, and biographical entries for Australian musicians, performers, composers, groups and ensembles, festivals and organisations.

Music Australia uses various permalinks to ensure permanent links and access to its resources. These permalinks can be used from any browser and do not require the Music Australia website to be open.

History of development
Developing and delivering the systems to make the service possible posed enormous challenges to music librarians and information professionals across Australia. When the first ideas for a service were floated in 2001, Australia’s music was scattered across many different institutions, libraries, archives, museums and arts and specialists music organisations, and there was no way for users or researchers to find and access them. There were no collections of digitised printed music and although some national institutions had been digitally preserving their sound collections, none were available online.

As part of the content generation the National Library developed a cooperative plan with the state libraries to digitize Australian sheet music within their emerging digitisation programs. Some state libraries, such as Queensland and Western Australia, also developed arts initiatives to perform and record hitherto unknown historic musical works pertaining to their regions, and others, such as the State Library of South Australia, commenced programs to digitally preserve and deliver sound recordings.

Resource database

Music Australia consists of 2 linked databases, one for the resource description and one for people and organisation information. The resource database, as a sub-set of the ANDB, was to manage its data in MARC format. This made the data harvest and exchange from libraries and institutions using MARC relatively easy to manage, and to use to develop and build the service as the project team had solid experience with MARC based systems.

People and organisation database

The people and organisation information was to be sourced from a number of areas and contributors. The Project team investigated a number of potential schemas and data formats for this party database during 2003-2004. These investigations indicated that there was no mature schema with which to structure identifying and contextual information about people and organisations associated with Australian music for the Music Australia service. The Project team undertook to develop and implement its own schema, called Music Australia Party Schema (MAPS). As MADS had not yet been published, it was decided to use MODS elements where possible, incorporating some EAC elements, and to use appropriate terminology from MODS and EAC. Following publications of MADS, the MAPS schema was adjusted to reflect many of the MADS structure and terms. Various models or architectures applicable to a federated people and organisation database had to be considered, with the need to deliver data harvested from many different databases using many different standards, and the need to manage duplicated or even contradictory contextual information, and present this to users in a coherent manner.

Music Australia 1.0
Music Australia 1.0 was launched in March 2005 with a wide and substantial range of content from major and minor contributing institutions. Soon after release the service faced more challenges and changes, motivated by the need for sustainability amidst rapidly changing digital information business models and in response to external demands and user feedback.

The rapid changes in the music industry, driven by new technology and delivery models, posed many challenges for the service as we strived to stay relevant and to provide to users, for research or recreation, access to Australian music resources. The need to increase and to provide access to Australian digital music, both historical and contemporary, from printed music to the latest digital audio downloads, for users was a driving force as we looked to improve our service.

Music Australia 2.0
A new Business to Government (B2G) partnership with an Australian digital music supplier provided the opportunity for the service to offer to users access to a database of Australian contemporary online tracks and albums, with 30 second sound samples and pathways for legal digital downloads through e-commerce, while protecting the rights of artists and performers with digital rights management processes.

This B2G, together with identified service enhancements and bug fixes, combined with recommendations from a user and web usability survey commissioned in 2006, drove the changes to Music Australia 1.0. and resulted in the release of Music Australia 2.0 in April 2007.

References

Robyn Holmes and Marie-Louise Ayres. “Australia’s music: online, in time”. National Library of Australia news, May 2005.
Robyn Holmes and Marie-Louise Ayres. “Music Australia: Towards a National Music Information Infrastructure”. 5th International Conference on Music Information Retrieval Proceedings. Audiovisual Institute Pompeu Fabra University, Barcelona, 2004.
Marie-Louise Ayres. "MusicAustralia: Building on National Infrastructure". VALA 2004 Conference, Melbourne, Feb 3-6 2004
Roxanne Missingham. "A New Strategic Direction for the National Library of Australia". Alexandria, 16 (1): 37-48
Debbie Campbell. "Easy To Do: A brief history of federated harvesting in Australia". ETD 2005 conference, 30 September 2005.
Marie-Louise Ayres. "Case Studies in implementing Functional Requirements for Bibliographic Records[FRBR]: AustLit and MusicAustralia",ALJ: the Australian Library Journal February 2005, vol 54 no 1, pp 43–54
Warwick Cathro. "Digitization in Australasia". Serials: The Journal for the Serials Community, V.20, No. 1, March 2007, p. 9 - 15

External links
Music Australia
National Library of Australia
Australian Music Centre
National Film and Sound Archive

Library 2.0
Online music and lyrics databases
Australian music websites